The Raeburn Baronetcy, of Helensburgh in the County of Dunbarton, is a title in the Baronetage of the United Kingdom. It was created on 25 July 1923 for William Raeburn. He was head of the firm of Raeburn & Verel, Ltd, and also represented Dunbartonshire in the House of Commons as a Unionist. The fourth Baronet does not use his title.

Sir Digby Raeburn (1915–2001), son of Sir Ernest Manifold Raeburn (1878–1922), second son of the first Baronet, was a major general in the Scots Guards and Governor of the Tower of London.

Raeburn Baronets, of Helensburgh (1923) 
Sir William Hannay Raeburn, 1st Baronet (1850 – 12 February 1934)
Sir William Norman Raeburn, 2nd Baronet (1877–1947)
Sir Edward Alfred Raeburn, 3rd Baronet (1919–1977)
Michael Edward Norman Raeburn, 4th Baronet (Born 1954) As mentioned above, I do not actually use the title. This is due to being a Benedictine Oblate for the last 33 years and therefore use of the title would be out of place. I therefore prefer to use 'Obl.S.B.' after my Name.
Heir: Christopher Edward Alfred Raeburn (born 1981)

Notes

References
Kidd, Charles, Williamson, David (editors). Debrett's Peerage and Baronetage (1990 edition). New York: St Martin's Press, 1990, 

Daily Telegraph obituary of Sir Digby Raeburn

Raeburn